Ellen's Next Great Designer is an American furniture design reality competition series that aired from April 22 to May 20, 2021, on HBO Max. The six-episode season was announced in April 2021, as the latest furniture competition series executive produced by talk show host Ellen DeGeneres. Previously, DeGeneres had executive produced two seasons of Ellen's Design Challenge on HGTV that aired in 2015 and 2016.

Background 
The competition series featured seven promising furniture designers competing against one another in a series of weekly furniture design challenges and had just four short days to bring their piece of furniture from concept to production. Each designer worked out of their home studio and was assisted by a helper of their choice. Each time was designed in-house, but the designers were also able to with outside vendors, such as welders and CNC technicians, to bring their designs into reality.

“I really want to know: Where is design heading? What are the exciting things that the most talented and creative people are thinking about that don’t exist yet?” DeGeneres told AD over email. “No other show is asking and answering these questions, so I’ve created one that does.”

The judging panel featured award-winning furniture designer Fernando Mastrangelo, renowned interior designer Bridgette Romanek, and actor and furniture enthusiast Scott Foley. DeGeneres also weighed in at times.

The seven contestants included Christina Z. Antonio (Manhattan, NYC); Artless founder, Alejandro Artigas (Los Angeles, California); Slash Objects founder, Arielle Assouline-Lichten (Brooklyn, NYC);  Vidivixi founder, Mark Grattan (New Hope, Pennsylvania/Mexico City, MX); Paul Rene Furniture founder, Paul Jeffrey (Phoenix, Arizona);  Studio S II founder, Erica Sellers (Brooklyn, NYC); and Indo- founder, Urvi Sharma (Providence, Rhode Island).

After a final head-to-head battle with Arielle Assouline-Lichten in a shared Los Angeles woodshop, Mark Grattan as named the winner of the series and awarded the $100,000 prize.

Episodes

Season 1 (2021)

Season 1 Elimination Table 

  (WINNER) This designer won the competition due to another contestant's disqualification.
  (RUNNER UP) This designer finished in second place.
  (ELIM) The designer was eliminated from Ellen's Design Challenge.

 No one was eliminated during this episode.

See also 
Ellen's Design Challenge

References

External links

Ellen DeGeneres
2020s American reality television series
2021 American television series debuts
2021 American television series endings
English-language television shows
HBO Max original programming